David Warren Hyde is a sports columnist for the South Florida Sun Sentinel newspaper, the main daily newspaper of Fort Lauderdale.  He won the National Headliner Award in 2016 (and finished second in 2018) for top sports column writing in the country. He finished third in column writing by the Associated Press Sports Editors in 2017, the 15th time his work has been in the top 10 of APSE awards. Prior to joining the Sun-Sentinel as a columnist in 1990, he worked as a sportswriter at the Miami Herald from 1985-1990.  He has been a Sun-Sentinel columnist since 1990.  He attended Miami University in Oxford, Ohio where he was a member of Phi Kappa Tau and a writer for the Miami Student.  In 2008, Hyde wrote a book 1968; The Year That Saved Ohio State Football.  His work has been featured in The Best American Sports Writing.

External links
Dave Hyde's sports column archives
Dave Hyde's blog An older blog at Sun-Sentinel
 Present blog at Sun-Sentinel

Sportswriters from Florida
Miami University alumni
Living people
Year of birth missing (living people)